Callilitha tenaruensis is a moth in the family Crambidae. It was described by Eugene G. Munroe in 1959. It is found on Guadalcanal in the Solomon Islands.

References

Acentropinae
Moths described in 1959